The Forbidden Woman refers to the following films:

 The Forbidden Woman (1920 film), American silent film
 The Forbidden Woman (1927 film), American silent film

See also
 Forbidden Women (disambiguation)